Mission Santiago was founded by the Italian Jesuit Ignacio María Nápoli in 1724 and financed by the Marqués de Villapuente de la Peña and his wife the Marquesa de las Torres de Rada, at the native settlement of Aiñiní, about 40 kilometers north of San José del Cabo in the Cape Region of Baja California Sur, Mexico.

The mission took part of its name from the "Coras," the native people of the region. William C. Massey (1949) interpreted the Jesuit historical sources as indicating that the Coras were a Guaycura-speaking group, but a reexamination of the evidence favors the view that the name was a synonym for "Pericú" (Laylander 1997).

Mission Santiago was the first target of the Pericú Revolt in 1734. Its missionary, Lorenzo José Carranco, was killed, and the buildings were sacked. Rebuilding was begun in 1734, but the mission was ultimately abandoned during the Dominican period in 1795, and its remaining neophytes were relocated to San José del Cabo.

See also

 
 List of Jesuit sites

References
 Laylander, Don. 1997. "The linguistic prehistory of Baja California". In Contributions to the Linguistic Prehistory of Central and Baja California, edited by Gary S. Breschini and Trudy Haversat, pp. 1–94. Coyote Press, Salinas, California.
 Massey, William C. 1949. "Tribes and languages of Baja California". Southwestern Journal of Anthropology 5:272–307.
 Nápoli, Ignacio María. 1970. The Cora Indians of Baja California: The Relación of Father Ignacio María Nápoli, S.J., September 20, 1721. Edited by James Robert Moriarty, III, and Benjamin F. Smith. Dawson's Book Shop, Los Angeles.
 Vernon, Edward W. 2002. Las Misiones Antiguas: The Spanish Missions of Baja California, 1683–1855. Viejo Press, Santa Barbara, California.

Santiago de Los Coras
Los Cabos Municipality (Baja California Sur)
1724 establishments in New Spain